Live in New York at Jazz Standard is a live album by drummer Antonio Sánchez which was recorded in New York in 2008 and released as a double CD on the CAM Jazz label in 2010.

Reception

On All About Jazz, John Kelman observed "Live in New York at Jazz Standard may not represent where Sanchez is today, but if these performances are any indication, following the drummer beyond his superb sideman work is a must, as his abilities as a composer/bandleader continue to grow in parallel with his rapid upward trajectory as a player". BBC Music's Lara Bellini said "Words can’t quite do justice to how superbly the quartet performs. Sanchez has built a strong rapport with his colleagues, and although he is pivotal in everything, the whole is inarguably greater than the sum ... Live in New York truly marks the passage of Sanchez from side man to leader".

Track listing
All compositions by Antonio Sánchez except where noted.

Disc One:
 "Greedy Silence" – 19:05
 "H and H" (Pat Metheny) – 16:14
 "Ballade" – 12:09
 "Revelation" (Miguel Zenón) – 17:39	

Disc Two:
 "It Will Be Better (Once People Get Here)" – 13:36
 "Did You Get It" – 17:53
 "The Forgotten Ones" (David Sánchez) – 7:35
 "Challenge Within" – 20:00

Personnel
Antonio Sánchez – drums
Miguel Zenón – alto saxophone
David Sánchez – tenor saxophone
Scott Colley – bass

References 

2010 live albums
Antonio Sánchez (drummer) albums
CAM Jazz albums
Live jazz albums